Marvin Orlando Angarita Reyes (born April 11, 1989 in Barrancabermeja, Santander) is a Colombian cyclist.

In 2019, Angarita won a silver medal at the Pan American Games as part of the Colombian team pursuit squad.

Major results

2010
 1st Stage 4 Clásico RCN
2011
 1st  Road race, National Under-23 Road Championships
 Vuelta a Venezuela
1st Stages 2, 8b, 11 & 12
 1st Stage 4 Clásico RCN
2012
 Vuelta al Mundo Maya
1st Stages 7 & 8
2013
 Vuelta al Ecuador
1st Stages 5 & 7
2014
 1st  Sprints classification Vuelta a Colombia
2019
 2nd Team pursuit, Pan American Games

References

External links

Living people
1989 births
Colombian male cyclists
Sportspeople from Santander Department
Pan American Games medalists in cycling
Pan American Games silver medalists for Colombia
Cyclists at the 2019 Pan American Games
Medalists at the 2019 Pan American Games
21st-century Colombian people
Competitors at the 2018 Central American and Caribbean Games